The discography of Insane Clown Posse, an American hip rock duo from Delray, Detroit, composed of Joseph Bruce and Joseph Utsler, who perform under the respective personas of the wicked clowns Violent J and Shaggy 2 Dope, consists of sixteen studio albums, eighty-four singles, nineteen extended plays and nineteen compilations. Music videos and collaborations are also included, as are film and television appearances and home video releases.

Originally known as Inner City Posse, the group introduced supernatural -- and horror-themed lyrics as a means of distinguishing itself stylistically. Insane Clown Posse founded the independent record label Psychopathic Records with Alex Abbiss as manager, and produced and starred in the feature films Big Money Hustlas and Big Money Rustlas. They have collaborated with many famous hip hop and rock musicians. They have earned three gold albums and two platinum albums.

They have been in the supergroups: Golden Goldies (1995), Dark Lotus (1998–2018), Psychopathic Rydas (1999–2018), Soopa Villainz (2002–2005), The Bloody Brothers (2005; 2018–present), The Killjoy Club (2013–2016; 2018) and The Loony Goons (2018–present).

Albums

Studio albums

Cover albums

Compilations

Collaboration albums

Extended plays

Box sets

Solo albums

Group albums

Label compilation albums

Singles

As lead artist

Hallowicked singles

Guest appearances

Original contributions to compilations

Videography

Video albums
Shockumentary (1997, 1998 VHS, 2004 DVD)
Bootlegged in L.A. (2003 DVD)
Psychopathic: The Videos (2007 DVD)
Hatchet Attacks: Live From Red Rocks (2008 DVD)
A Family Underground (2009 DVD)
American Psycho Tour Documentary (2012 DVD)
The Riddle Box Weekend (2013 2xDVD)
Psychopathic: The Videos Volume 2 (2014 2xDVD)
2012 New Years Eve Ninja Party (2015 DVD)
Bootlegged In Detroit (2020 DVD)
Historical Tours (2021 DVD)

Films
Big Money Hustlas (2000 VHS/DVD)
Bowling Balls (2004 DVD)
Chronicles of the Dark Carnival (2006 TV, 2013 DVD, 2016 Ltd. Ed. DVD)
Death Racers (2008 DVD)
Big Money Rustlas (2010 DVD, 2015 DVD)

Appearances
Backstage Sluts (1999 VHS)
Backstage Pass (1999 VHS/DVD)
Born Twiztid: Beyond the Freakshow (2000 VHS/DVD)

Wrestling
 ICP's Strangle-Mania (1995)
ECW Hardcore Heaven (1997)
WWF Summerslam (1998)
Strangle Mania 2 (1999)
WCW Road Wild (1999)
WCW Fall Brawl (1999)
JCW, Volume 1 (2000)
JCW, Volume 2 (2001)
XPW Redemption (2001)
JCW, Volume 3 (2003)
JCW: SlamTV – Episodes 1 thru 9 (2007)
JCW: SlamTV – Episodes 10 thru 15 featuring Bloodymania (2007)

Music videos

As lead artist

Solo music videos

Group music videos

Psypher music videos

References

Hip hop discographies
Discographies of American artists
Rap rock discographies